Brian Gregory Stapleton (born December 25, 1951) is a Canadian retired professional ice hockey right winger who played in one National Hockey League game for the Washington Capitals during the 1975–76 NHL season.

Career statistics

Regular season and playoffs

Transactions
 Signed as a free agent by the Washington Capitals, October, 1975.

See also
List of players who played only one game in the NHL

External links

1951 births
Living people
Brown Bears men's ice hockey players
Canadian ice hockey right wingers
Dayton Gems players
Fort Wayne Komets players
Washington Capitals players
Ice hockey people from Ontario
Sportspeople from Fort Erie, Ontario
Undrafted National Hockey League players